Henrietta Gould Rowe (Gould; 1835 – October 27, 1910) was an American litterateur and author of the long nineteenth century.

Biography
Henrietta (sometimes "Harriet") Gould was born in East Corinth, Maine, 1835. She was the daughter of Aaron and Sarah Gould. Rowe received an academic education.

She married James Swett Rowe of Bangor, Maine on October 25, 1856. After her marriage, she removed to Bangor, Maine and resided thereafter in that city.  

She began to write as soon as she could make letters on her slate, but only after her marriage did she write for publication. She did a great deal of literary work in the subsequent decades, principally prose, with an occasional poem. She wrote for The Youth's Companion, Portland Transcript, Wide-Awake, and various other publications. Rowe published various volumes, including Re-told Tales of the Hills and Shores of Maine (1892); Queenshithe (1895); and A Maid of Bar Harbor (1902). As an author, she received positive recognition, and her last book did fair to out-rival her Re-Told Tales, which passed through several editions. She wrote poems and stories for many magazines, principally relating to New England life and character. She was also an educator of advanced pupils in history and literature, and a prominent clubwoman.

Death
Henrietta Gould Rowe died October 27, 1910.

Works
Re-told Tales of the Hills and Shores of Maine, 1892
Queenshithe, 1895
A Maid of Bar Harbor, 1902

Notes

References

Bibliography

External links
 

1835 births
1910 deaths
19th-century American writers
19th-century American women writers
20th-century American writers
20th-century American women writers
People from Corinth, Maine
Writers from Maine